Cyathea decora is a species of tree fern native to Ecuador and possibly other parts of western South America. Little is known about this species. The name is the source of some taxonomic confusion: , Plants of the World Online regarded "Cyathea decora" as an unplaced name, and it was not listed at all in World Ferns.

Cyathea decora is not to be confused with the similarly named Cyathea decorata.

References

The International Plant Names Index: Cyathea decora

decora
Ferns of the Americas
Ferns of Ecuador
Flora of western South America